NGC 709 is a lenticular galaxy  located 150 million light-years away in the constellation Andromeda. It was discovered by the Irish engineer and astronomer Bindon Blood Stoney on October 28, 1850 and is a member of the galaxy cluster Abell 262.

See also
 List of NGC objects (1–1000)

References

External links

709
6969
Andromeda (constellation)
Astronomical objects discovered in 1850
Lenticular galaxies
Abell 262
Discoveries by Bindon Blood Stoney